The 2001 DFB-Ligapokal Final decided the winner of the 2001 DFB-Ligapokal, the 5th edition of the reiterated DFB-Ligapokal, a knockout football cup competition.

The match was played on 21 July 2001 at the Carl-Benz-Stadion in Mannheim. Hertha BSC won the match 4–1 against Schalke 04 for their 1st title.

Teams

Route to the final
The DFB-Ligapokal is a six team single-elimination knockout cup competition. There are a total of two rounds leading up to the final. Four teams enter the preliminary round, with the two winners advancing to the semi-finals, where they will be joined by two additional clubs who were given a bye. For all matches, the winner after 90 minutes advances. If still tied, extra time, and if necessary penalties are used to determine the winner.

Match

Details

References

2001
FC Schalke 04 matches
Hertha BSC matches
2001–02 in German football cups